Nikolaus Riehl (24 May 1901 – 2 August 1990) was a German nuclear physicist.  He was head of the scientific headquarters of Auergesellschaft.  When the Russians entered Berlin near the end of World War II, he was invited to the Soviet Union, where he stayed for 10 years.  For his work on the Soviet atomic bomb project, he was awarded a Stalin Prize, Lenin Prize, and Order of the Red Banner of Labor.  When he was repatriated to Germany in 1955, he chose to go to West Germany, where he joined Heinz Maier-Leibnitz on his nuclear reactor staff at  Technische Hochschule München (THM); Riehl made contributions to the nuclear facility Forschungsreaktor München (FRM). In 1961 he became an ordinarius professor of technical physics at THM and concentrated his research activities on solid state physics, especially the physics of ice and the optical spectroscopy of solids.

Education

Riehl was born in Saint Petersburg, Russia in 1901.  His mother Elena Riehl (née Kagan) was Russian-Jewish and his father Wilhelm Gottfried Riehl was a professional German engineer employed by  Siemens and Halske. With this background, Riehl spoke fluent German and Russian.  From 1920 to 1927, he studied physics and physical chemistry at the Humboldt University of Berlin. He received his doctorate in nuclear physics from the University of Berlin in 1927, under the guidance of the nuclear physicist Lise Meitner and the nuclear chemist Otto Hahn; his thesis topic was on Geiger-Müller counters for beta ray spectroscopy.

Career

Early years

Riehl initially took a position in German industry with Auergesellschaft, where he became an authority on luminescence. While he completed his Habilitation, he continued his industrial career at Auergesellschaft, as opposed to working in academia.  From 1927, he was a staff scientist in the radiology department. From 1937, he was head of the optical engineering department.  From 1939 to 1945, he was the director of the scientific headquarters.

Auergesellschaft had a substantial amount of "waste" uranium from which it had extracted radium. After reading a paper in 1939 by Siegfried Flügge, on the technical use of nuclear energy from uranium, Riehl recognized a business opportunity for the company, and, in July of that year, went to the Heereswaffenamt (HWA, Army Ordnance Office) to discuss the production of uranium.  The HWA was interested and Riehl committed corporate resources to the task.  The HWA eventually provided an order for the production of uranium oxide, which took place in the Auergesellschaft plant in Oranienburg, north of Berlin.

In the Soviet Union

Near the close of World War II, as American, British, and Russian military forces were closing in on Berlin, Riehl and some of his staff moved to a village west of Berlin, to try and assure occupation by British or American forces. However, in mid-May 1945, with the assistance of Riehl's colleague Karl Günter Zimmer, the Russian nuclear physicists Georgy Flerov and Lev Artsimovich showed up one day in NKVD colonel's uniforms. The use of Russian nuclear physicists in the wake of Soviet troop advances to identify and "requisition" equipment, materiel, intellectual property, and personnel useful to the Russian atomic bomb project is similar to the American Operation Alsos.  The military head of Alsos was Lt. Col. Boris Pash, former head of security on the American atomic bomb effort, the Manhattan Project, and its chief scientist was the eminent physicist Samuel Goudsmit.  In early 1945, the Soviets initiated an effort similar to Alsos (Russian Alsos).  Forty out of less than 100 Russian scientists from the  Soviet atomic bomb project's Laboratory 2 went to Germany, Austria, and Czechoslovakia in support of acquisitions for the project.

The two colonels requested that Riehl join them in Berlin for a few days, where he also met with nuclear physicist Yulii Borisovich Khariton, also in the uniform of an NKVD colonel.  This sojourn in Berlin turned into 10 years in the Soviet Union!  Riehl and his staff, including their families, were flown to Moscow on 9 July 1945. Eventually, Riehl's entire laboratory was dismantled and transported to the Soviet Union.

Other prominent German scientists from Berlin who were taken to the Soviet Union at that time, and who would cross paths with Riehl, were Manfred von Ardenne, director of his private laboratory Forschungslaboratoriums für Elektronenphysik, Gustav Hertz, Nobel Laureate and director of Research Laboratory II at Siemens,  Peter Adolf Thiessen, ordinarius professor at the Humboldt University of Berlin and director of the Kaiser-Wilhelm Institut für physikalische Chemi und Elektrochemie (KWIPC) in Berlin-Dahlem, and Max Volmer, ordinarius professor and director of the Physical Chemistry Institute at the Berlin Technische Hochschule.  Soon after being taken to the Soviet Union, Riehl, von Ardenne, Hertz, and Volmer were summoned for a meeting with Lavrentij Beria, head of the NKVD and the Soviet atomic bomb project.

When a Soviet search team arrived at the Auergesellschaft facility in Oranienburg, they found nearly 100 tons of fairly pure uranium oxide. The Soviet Union took this uranium as reparations, which amounted to between 25% and 40% of the uranium taken from Germany and Czechoslovakia at the end of the war. Khariton said the uranium found there saved the Soviet Union a year on its atomic bomb project.

From 1945 to 1950, Riehl was in charge of uranium production at Plant No. 12 in Ehlektrostal' (Электросталь).  German scientists, who were mostly atomic scientists, sent by the Soviets, at the close of World War II, to work in the Riehl group at Plant No. 12 included A. Baroni (PoW), Hans-Joachim Born, Alexander Catsch (Katsch), Werner Kirst, H. E. Ortmann, Herbert Schmitz (PoW), Walter Sommerfeldt, Herbert Thieme, Günter Wirths, and Karl Günter Zimmer as well as Heinrich Tobien, formerly "Chemiemeister" at Auergesellschaft; Walter Przybilla, brother of Riehl's wife, and mentioned in this context, also spent 10 years in SU, but was not a scientist under Riehl.  While Born, Catsch, and Zimmer had collaborated with Riehl in Germany, they were actually not part of  Auergesellschaft but with N. V. Timofeev-Resovskij's Genetics Department at the Kaiser-Wilhelm Gesellschaft's Institut für Hirnforschung (KWIH, Kaiser Wilhelm Institute for Brain Research) in Berlin-Buch.  Riehl had a hard time incorporating these three into his tasking at Plant No. 12 on his uranium production tasking, as Born was a radiochemist, Catsch was a physician and radiation biologist, and Zimmer was a physicist and radiation biologist.

The Ehlektrostal' Plant No. 12, by the last quarter of 1946, was delivering about three metric tons of metallic uranium per week to Laboratory No. 2., which was later known as the  Kurchatov Institute of Atomic Energy.  By 1950, Plant No. 12 was producing about one metric ton per day, and it was not the only metallic uranium production plant in operation.

After the detonation of the Russian uranium bomb, uranium production was going smoothly and Riehl's oversight was no longer necessary at Plant No. 12. Riehl then went, in 1950, to head an institute in Sungul', where he stayed until 1952. Essentially the remaining personnel in his group were assigned elsewhere, with the exception of H. E. Ortmann, A. Baroni (PoW), and Herbert Schmitz (PoW), who went with Riehl. However, Riehl had already sent Born, Catsch, and Zimmer to the institute in December 1947. The German contingent at the institute in Sungul' never exceeded 26 – in 1946 there were 95 people at the facility, which grew to 451 by 1955, and the German contingent had already left a few years before that. Besides those already mentioned, other Germans at the institute were Rinatia von Ardenne (sister of Manfred von Ardenne, director of Institute A, in Sukhumi) Wilhelm Menke, Willi Lange (who married the widow of Karl-Heinrich Riewe, who had been at Heinz Pose's Laboratory V, in Obninsk), Joachim Pani, and K. K. Rintelen. The institute in Sungul' was responsible for the handling, treatment, and use of radioactive products generated in reactors, as well as radiation biology, dosimetry, and radiochemistry. The institute was known as Laboratory B, and it was overseen by the 9th Chief Directorate of the NKVD (MVD after 1946), the same organization which oversaw the Russian Alsos operation. The scientific staff of Laboratory B – a ShARAShKA – was both Soviet and German, the former being mostly political prisoners or exiles, although some of the service staff were criminals. (Laboratory V, in Obninsk, headed by Heinz Pose, was also a sharashka and working on the Soviet atomic bomb project. Other notable Germans at the facility were Werner Czulius, Hans Jürgen von Oertzen, Ernst Rexer, and Carl Friedrich Weiss.)

Laboratory B was known under another cover name as Объект 0211 (Ob'ekt 0211, Object 0211), as well as Object B. (In 1955, Laboratory B was closed. Some of its personnel were transferred elsewhere, but most of them were assimilated into a new, second nuclear weapons institute, Scientific Research Institute-1011, NII-1011, today known as the Russian Federal Nuclear Center All-Russian Scientific Research Institute of Technical Physics, RFYaTs–VNIITF. NII-1011 had the designation предприятие п/я 0215, i.e., enterprise post office box 0215 and Объект 0215; the latter designation has also been used in reference to Laboratory B after its closure and assimilation into NII-1011.)

One of the political prisoners in Laboratory B was Riehls' colleague from the KWIH, N. V. Timofeev-Resovskij, who, as a Soviet citizen, was arrested by the Soviet forces in Berlin at the conclusion of the war, and he was sentenced to 10 years in the Gulag. In 1947, Timofeev-Resovskij was rescued out of a harsh Gulag prison camp, nursed back to health, and sent to Sungul' to complete his sentence, but still make a contribution to the Soviet atomic bomb project. At Laboratory B, Timofeev-Resovskij headed the radiobiology department at Laboratory B, and another political prisoner, S. A. Voznesenskij, headed the radiochemistry department. At Laboratory B, Born, Catsch, and Zimmer were able to conduct work similar to that which they had done in Germany, and all three became section heads in Timofeev-Resovskij's department.

Until Riehl's return to Germany in June 1955, which Riehl had to request and negotiate, he was quarantined in Agudseri (Agudzery, in Russian Агудзера) starting in 1952. The home in which Riehl lived had been designed by Max Volmer and had been previously occupied by Gustav Hertz, when he was director of Laboratory G.

For his contributions to the Soviet atomic bomb project, Riehl was awarded a Stalin Prize (first class), a Lenin Prize, and the Hero of Socialist Labor medal.  As part of the awards, he was also given a Dacha west of Moscow; but he did not accept the dacha because he wanted to keep personal distance from the soviets and to return to his homeland.  For work at Plant No. 12, Riehl's colleagues Wirths and Thieme were awarded a Stalin Prize and the Order of the Red Banner of Soviet Labor, also known and the Order of the Red Flag.

Return to Germany

In 1954, the Deutsche Demokratische Republik (DDR, German Democratic Republic) and the Soviet Union prepared a list of scientists they wished to keep in the DDR, due to their having worked on projects related to the Soviet atomic bomb project; this list was known as the "A-list". On this A-list were the names of 18 scientists, dominated by members of the Riehl group, which worked at Plant No. 12 in Ehlektrostal'.

While Riehl's work for the Soviet Union netted him significant prestige and wealth, his primary motivation for leaving Russia was freedom.  Riehl arrived in East Germany on 4 April 1955; however, by early June he had fled to West Germany.  Once there, he joined Heinz Maier-Leibniz on his nuclear reactor staff at Technische Hochschule München, where he made contributions, starting in 1957, to the nuclear facility Forschungsreaktor München (FRM). In 1961 he became an ordinarius professor of technical physics there and concentrated his research activities on solid state physics, especially the physics of ice and optical spectroscopy of solids.

Personal

Riehl and his wife Ilse, had two daughters, Ingeborg (oldest) and Irene. Riehl had a son who had died of natural causes and was buried in Germany.

Selected publications and patents

The majority of these literature citations have been garnered by searching on variations of the author's name on Google, Google Scholar, the Energy Citations Database.

P. M. Wolf and N. Riehl Über die Zerstörung von Zinksulfidphosphoren durch - Strahlung, Annalen der Physik, Volume 403, Issue 1, 103-112 (1931)
P. M. Wolf and N. Riehl Über die Zerstörung von Zinksulfidphosphoren durch - Strahlen. 2. Mitteilung, Annalen der Physik, Volume 409, Issue 5, 581-586 (1933)
Nikolaus Riehl Transparent Coating,  Patent number: CA 350884, Patent owner: Degea Aktiengesellschft (Auergesellschaft), Issue date: June 11, 1935,  Canadian Class (CPC): 117/238.
Nikolaus Riehl Light-Modifying Article and Method of Producing the Same, Patent number: 2088438, Filing date: Jun 2, 1934, Issue date: Jul 27, 1937, Assignee: Degea.
N. Riehl and H. Ortmann Über die Druckzerstörung von Phosphoren, Annalen der Physik, Volume 421, Issue 6, 556-568 (1937)
N. Riehl New results with luminescent zinc sulphide and other luminous substances, Trans. Faraday Soc. Volume 35, 135 - 140 (1939) 
N. Riehl Die "Energiewanderung" in Kristallen und Molekülkomplexen, Naturwissenschaften Volume 28, Number 38, Pages 601-607 (1940). The author was identified as being at the wissenschaftlichen Laboratorium der Auergesellschaft, Berlin.
N. Riehl, N. V. Timofeev-Resovskij, and K. G. Zimmer Mechanismus der Wirkung ionisierender Strahlen auf biologische Elementareinheiten, Die Naturwissenschaften Volume 29, Numbers 42-43, 625-639 (1941).  Riehl was identified as being in Berlin, and the other two were identified as being in Berlin-Buch.
N. Riehl, Physik und technische Anwendungen der Lumineszenz. Springer; Softcover reprint of the original 1st ed. 1941 (4. Oktober 2013). 
N. Riehl Zum Mechanismus der Energiewanderung bei Oxydationsfermenten, Naturwissenschaften Volume 31, Numbers 49-50, 590-591 (1943)
N. Riehl, R. Rompe, N. W. Timoféeff-Ressovsky und K. G. Zimmer Über Energiewanderungsvorgänge und Ihre Bedeutung Für Einige Biologische Prozesse, Protoplasma Volume 38, Number 1, 105-126 (1943).  The article was received on 19 April 1943.
 G. I. Born (H. J. Born), N. Riehl, K. G. Zimmer, Title translated from the Russian: Efficiency of Luminescence Production by Beta Rays in Zinc Sulfide, Doklady Akademii Nauk SSSR Volume 59, March, 1269-1272 (1948)
N. Riehl and H. Ortmann Über die Struktur von Leuchtzentren in aktivatorhaltigen Zinksulfidphosphoren, Annalen der Physik, Volume 459, Issue 1, 3-14 (1959). Institutional affiliations: Technische Hochschule und Liebenwalde, Munich; Deutschen Akademie der Wissenschaften, Munich.
N. Riehl and R. Sizmann Production of Extremely High Lattice Defect Concentration in the Irradiation of Solid Bodies in Reactors [In German], Zeitschrift für Angewandte Physik Volume 11, 202-207 (1959). Institutional affiliation: Technische Physik der Technische Hochschule, Munich.
N. Riehl, R. Sizmann, and O. J. Stadler Effects of Alpha-Irradiation on Zinc Sulfide Phosphors [In German], Zeitschrift für Naturforschung A Volume 16, 13-20 (1961). Institutional affiliation: Technische Hochschule, Munich.
K. Fink, N. Riehl, and O. Selig Contribution to the Question of the Cobalt Content in Reactor Construction Steel [In German], Nukleonik Volume 3, 41-49 (1961). Institutional Affiliations: Phoenix-Rheinrohr A.G., Düsseldorf; and Technische Hochschule, Munich.
N. Riehl and R. Sizmann Effects of High Energy Irradiation on Phosphors [In German], Physica Status Solidi Volume 1, 97-119 (1961). Institutional affiliation: Technische Hochschule, Munich.
N. Riehl Effects of High Energy Radiation on the Surface of Solid Bodies [In German], Kerntechnik Volume 3, 518-521 (1961). Institutional affiliation: Technische Hochschule, Munich.
H. Blicks, N. Riehl, and R. Sizmann Reversible Light Center Transformations in ZnS Phosphors [In German], Z. Physik Volume 163, 594-603 (1961). Institutional affiliation: Technische Hochschule, Munich.
N. Riehl, W. Schilling, and H. Meissner Design and Installation of a Low Temperature Irradiation Facility at the Munich Research Reactor FRM, Res. Reactor J. Volume 3, Number 1, 9-13 (1962). Institutional affiliation: Technische Hochschule, Munich.
S. Hoffmann, N. Riehl, W. Rupp, and R. Sizmann Radiolysis of Water Vapor by Alpha-Radiation [In German], Radiochimica Acta Volume 1, 203-207 (1963). Institutional affiliation: Technische Hochschule, Munich.
O. Degel and N. Riehl Diffusion of Protons (Tritons) in Ice Crystals [In German], Physik Kondensierten Materie Volume 1, 191-196 (1963). Institutional affiliation: Technische Hochschule, Munich.
R. Doll,  H. Meissner, N. Riehl, W. Schiling, and F. Schemissner Construction of a Low-Temperature Irradiation Apparatus at the Munich Research Reactor [In German] Zeitschrift für Angewandte Physik Volume 17, 321-329 (1964). Institutional affiliation: Bayerische Akademie der Wissenschaften, Munich.
N. Riehl and R. Sizmann The Abnormal Volatility of Alpha-Irradiated Materials [In German], Radiochimica Acta Volume 3, 44-47 (1964). Institutional affiliation: Technische Hochschule, Munich.
H. Blicks, O. Dengel, and N. Riehl Diffusion of Protons (Tritons) in Pure and Doped Ice Monocrystals [In German], Physik der Kondensierten Materie Volume 4, 375-381 (1966). Institutional affiliation: Technische Hochschule, Munich.
O. Dengel, E. Jacobs, and N. Riehl Diffusion of Tritons in NH4-Doped Ice Single Crystals [In German], Physik der Kondensierten Materie Volume 5, 58-59 (1966). Institutional affiliation: Technische Hochschule, Munich.
H. Engelhardt, H. Müller-Krumbhaar, B. Bullemer, and N. Riehl Detection of Single Collisions of Fast Neutrons by Nucleation of Tyndall Flowers in Ice, J. Appl. Phys.  Volume 40: 5308-5311(Dec 1969). Institutional affiliation: Technische Hochschule, Munich.
N. Riehl and F. Fischer Einführung in die Lumineszenz, Thiemig, 1971.
N. Riehl, A. Muller, and R. Wengert Release of trapped charge carriers by phonons generated by alpha-particles [In German], Z. Naturforsch., Volume 28, Number 6, 1040-1041 (1973). Institutional affiliation: Technische Universität, Munich.
N. Riehl and R. Wengert Charge carrier release in He-cooled crystals by phonon fluxes generated by impinging hot gas atoms, by heat pulses, or by alpha-particles, Journal: Phys. Status Solidi (a), Volume 28, Number 2, 503-509 (1975). Institutional affiliation: Technische Universität, Munich.

Books

Nikolaus Riehl and Henry Ortmann Über den Aufbau der Zinksulfid-Luminophore (Verl. Chemie, 1957) 
Riehl, Nikolaus, Bernhard Bullemer, and Hermann Engelhardt (editors). Physics of Ice. Proceedings of the International Symposium, Munich, 1968 (Plenum, 1969)
Fred Fischer and Nikolaus Riehl Einführung in die Lumineszenz (Thiemig, 1971)
Nikolaus Riehl and Frederick Seitz Stalin's Captive: Nikolaus Riehl and the Soviet Race for the Bomb (American Chemical Society and the Chemical Heritage Foundations, 1996) .  This book is a translation of Nikolaus Riehl's book Zehn Jahre im goldenen Käfig (Ten Years in a Golden Cage) (Riederer-Verlag, 1988); Seitz has written a lengthy introduction to the book. This book is a treasure trove with its 58 photographs.

See also
Russian Alsos

Notes

References

Albrecht, Ulrich, Andreas Heinemann-Grüder,  and Arend Wellmann Die Spezialisten: Deutsche Naturwissenschaftler und Techniker in der Sowjetunion nach 1945 (Dietz, 1992, 2001) 
Barwich, Heinz and Elfi Barwich Das rote Atom (Fischer-TB.-Vlg., 1984)
Heinemann-Grüder, Andreas Die sowjetische Atombombe (Westfaelisches Dampfboot, 1992) 
Heinemann-Grüder, Andreas Keinerlei Untergang: German Armaments Engineers during the Second World War and in the Service of the Victorious Powers in Monika Renneberg and Mark Walker (editors) Science, Technology and National Socialism 30-50 (Cambridge, 2002 paperback edition) 
Hentschel, Klaus (editor) and Ann M. Hentschel (editorial assistant and translator) Physics and National Socialism: An Anthology of Primary Sources (Birkhäuser, 1996) 
Holloway, David Stalin and the Bomb: The Soviet Union and Atomic Energy 1939–1956 (Yale, 1994) 
Maddrell, Paul "Spying on Science: Western Intelligence in Divided Germany 1945–1961" (Oxford, 2006) 
Naimark, Norman M. The Russians in Germany: A History of the Soviet Zone of Occupation, 1945-1949 (Belknap, 1995)
Oleynikov, Pavel V. German Scientists in the Soviet Atomic Project, The Nonproliferation Review Volume 7, Number 2, 1 – 30  (2000).  The author has been a group leader at the Institute of Technical Physics of the Russian Federal Nuclear Center in Snezhinsk (Chelyabinsk-70).
Riehl, Nikolaus and Frederick Seitz Stalin's Captive: Nikolaus Riehl and the Soviet Race for the Bomb (American Chemical Society and the Chemical Heritage Foundations, 1996) .
Walker, Mark German National Socialism and the Quest for Nuclear Power 1939–1949'' (Cambridge, 1993)

External links
History – Technische Hochschule München

1901 births
1990 deaths
Scientists from Saint Petersburg
Baltic-German people
Jews from the Russian Empire
20th-century German chemists
Jewish chemists
Stalin Prize winners
Nuclear weapons program of the Soviet Union
Nuclear program of Nazi Germany
Humboldt University of Berlin alumni
Academic staff of the Technical University of Munich